Graeme Bradley (born 20 March 1964) is an Australian former professional rugby league footballer who played in the 1980s and 1990s.

Playing career
He played for the Illawarra Steelers, Penrith Panthers and the St. George Dragons in the New South Wales Rugby League premiership (NSWRL) as well as the Castleford Tigers (Heritage № 696) and Bradford Bulls in England.

Bradley played junior football with Oatley RSL, New South Wales. Bradley entered first-grade after Illawarra Steelers' coach, Brian Smith, signed him to the club in 1985. Smith had been Bradley's school-teacher. He spent three years with the Steelers before moving to the Penrith Panthers.

The Panthers reached back-to-back grand finals, in 1990 and 1991. Bradley was named on the bench for the 1991 grand final and although he spent 40 minutes warming up on the sidelines, coach Phil Gould did not send Bradley on. Following the grand final victory he travelled with the Panthers to England for the 1991 World Club Challenge which was lost to Wigan. After this he followed former Steelers coach Brian Smith to the St George Dragons. Bradley played in the 1993 grand final for St George in 1993.

Graeme Bradley played left-, i.e. number 11,  in Castleford's 12-28 defeat by Wigan in the 1992 Challenge Cup Final during the 1991–92 season at Wembley Stadium, London on Saturday 2 May 1992, in front of a crowd of 77,386.

When Brian Smith left Australia to coach the Bradford Bulls in the newly formed Super League he signed Graeme, and he spent 3 successful years there, including an appearance at stand-off half for them in their 1996 Challenge Cup Final loss to St. Helens, and winning 1997's Super League II. He retired following 1998's Super League III.

Footnotes

References

External links
Graeme Bradley at The Rugby League Project
Graeme Bradley at NRL Stats
Bull Masters - Graeme Bradley
Statistics at thecastlefordtigers.co.uk

1964 births
Living people
Australian rugby league players
Australian expatriate sportspeople in England
Bradford Bulls players
Castleford Tigers players
Illawarra Steelers players
Penrith Panthers players
Rugby league centres
Rugby league players from Sydney
St. George Dragons players